Michael Coutts-Trotter is an Australian public servant who is the current Secretary of the NSW Department of Premier and Cabinet for Premier Dominic Perrottet.

He was previously Secretary of the New South Wales Department of Communities and Justice. He was previously the director-general of the Departments of Education and Customer Service. Coutts-Trotter served almost three years of a nine-year prison sentence after being convicted for the importation and distribution of heroin into Australia in 1986.

Early life
Coutts-Trotter was born in England and arrived in Australia with his parents in 1976. His father Paul was the son of Sir Murray Coutts-Trotter, former chief Justice of Madras, while his mother Helen was from Cootamundra. Coutts-Trotter matriculated from Saint Ignatius' College, Riverview. In 1986, he received a nine-year prison sentence as a drug dealer selling heroin to addicts. He served two years and nine months in jail before parole in 1988. He graduated from the University of Technology Sydney with a degree in communications in 1995.

Public service career
In April 2007, Coutts-Trotter was appointed Director-General of the NSW Department of Education. This appointment was criticised by opposition members of parliament, the NSW Teachers Federation and the Public Principals Forum for his lack of experience in teaching and education and his criminal conviction as a heroin trafficker.

The Teachers Federation also questioned his criminal past and time spent in prison for heroin dealing; with the Federation's president, Maree O'Halloran, saying that a teacher with his criminal conviction for a serious drug offence would be unable to continue teaching and working with children.

Appointing him as Director-General of the Department of Finance and Services in April 2011, Premier Barry O'Farrell said that Coutts-Trotter's skills would allow this new department to deliver on its results. It was reported in July 2013, upon his appointment to lead the Department of Family and Community Services, that Coutts-Trotter's new role was a demotion. Following the report O'Farrell held a media conference to reject the suggestion.

In 2013, Coutts-Trotter was made a national fellow of the Institute of Public Administration Australia.

In April 2019, Coutts-Trotter was announced as the new head of the (NSW) Department of Communities & Justice after Andrew Cappie-Wood left that position.

In October 2021, the newly appointed NSW Premier Dominic Perrottet announced that Coutts-Trotter was promoted to the role of Secretary of the NSW Department of Premier and Cabinet.

Personal life
Coutts-Trotter is married to Tanya Plibersek, a federal MP and former deputy leader of the Australian Labor Party.

References

Public servants of New South Wales
Spouses of Australian politicians
Australian drug traffickers
Living people
Year of birth missing (living people)
People educated at Saint Ignatius' College, Riverview
University of Technology Sydney alumni